Grigoriy Ilyich Gruzinsky (1833–1899) was a Georgian royal prince (batonishvili) of the Bagrationi dynasty.

Grigoriy was son of Prince Ilia of Georgia and grandson of King George XII of Georgia.

He was aide to the Emperor of Russia from 1860 to 1863.

Family
In 1867 he married Olga Frolova (1844-1902) and had 7 children:
Aleksandre (1866-1917)
Ilia (1867-1947)
Petre (1868-1922)
Anastasia (1871-1956)
Elizabeth (1873-1901)
Tamar (1874-1898)
Nino (1876-1895)

Ancestry

References

1833 births
1899 deaths
Bagrationi dynasty of the Kingdom of Kartli-Kakheti
Georgian princes